John Martin Cates (March 23, 1878 – November 9, 1955) was an American college football player and coach and college athletics administrator. He served as the head football coach at Bowdoin College from 1925 to 1926. He was also the athletic director at Bowdoin from 1925 to 1927 and Yale University from 1927 to 1932.

Cates played football at Yale as an end and was the captain of the track team. He died on November 9, 1955, at his home in Rye, New York.

References

External links
 

1878 births
1955 deaths
American football ends
Bowdoin Polar Bears athletic directors
Bowdoin Polar Bears football coaches
Navy Midshipmen football coaches
Yale Bulldogs athletic directors
Yale Bulldogs football players
Yale Bulldogs men's track and field athletes
People from Rye, New York
People from St. George, Maine